Scinax altae is a species of frog in the family Hylidae. It is endemic to Panama where it occurs in the Pacific lowlands between the Chiriquí Province in the west and Panamá Province in the east. The type series was collected by Emmett Reid Dunn and his wife from "Summit" in the Panama Canal Zone in 1932.

Description
The snout is long and flat. The tympanum is distinct. The dorsum is gray to brownish gray and has four complete stripes (two dorsolateral and two paravertebral stripes; dorsal stripes are incomplete in a small fraction of individuals). The shanks have dark gray longitudinal stripes. The fingers are without webbing whereas the toes are about three fifths webbed. Males have a very large vocal sac.

Habitat and conservation
It is locally common. Major threats to it are infrastructure development and water pollution. It occurs in the Altos de Campana National Park.

References

altae
Amphibians of Panama
Endemic fauna of Panama
Taxa named by Emmett Reid Dunn
Amphibians described in 1933
Taxonomy articles created by Polbot